Rhygoplitis is a genus of braconid wasps in the family Braconidae. There are at least four described species in Rhygoplitis, found in the New World.

Species
These four species belong to the genus Rhygoplitis:
 Rhygoplitis aciculatus (Ashmead, 1900)
 Rhygoplitis choreuti (Viereck, 1912)
 Rhygoplitis sanctivincenti (Ashmead, 1900)
 Rhygoplitis terminalis (Gahan, 1912)

References

Further reading

 
 
 

Microgastrinae